Sir Thomas Alfred Hiley,  (25 November 1905 – 6 November 1990) was Treasurer of the Australian state of Queensland from 1957 to 1965.

Early life
Hiley was born in Brisbane, Queensland, the son of William and Maria Hiley (nee Savage). He was educated at Central Brisbane Primary School, Brisbane Grammar School and the University of Queensland. Hiley worked as a Chartered Accountant.

Political career
Hiley entered the Legislative Assembly of Queensland as member for Logan on 15 April 1944, a seat he held until switching to the new seat of Coorparoo on 29 April 1950.

When Coorparoo was abolished on 28 May 1960, Hiley represented the new district of Chatsworth until retiring on 28 May 1966.

Hiley was Treasurer of Queensland from 12 August 1957 to 23 December 1965 and leader of the Liberal Party in Queensland from 8 July 1949 to 12 August 1954 and again from 28 January to 23 December 1965.

Hiley was knighted as a Knight Commander of the Order of the British Empire (KBE) For service as Deputy Premier of Queensland.

Memorials
'Sir Thomas Hiley Park' was opened in Tewantin, Queensland on 17 April 1983 by Tony Elliott, who at the time was Minister for Tourism, National Parks, Sport and the Arts. Hiley had pioneered a project to allow wide-open areas for the community. The site is currently under lease to the Department of Defence as an Australian Navy Cadets Training Ship.

References

1905 births
1990 deaths
Australian Knights Commander of the Order of the British Empire
Australian politicians awarded knighthoods
Liberal Party of Australia members of the Parliament of Queensland
Deputy Premiers of Queensland
Treasurers of Queensland
20th-century Australian politicians